ARBOS is an Italian agricultural machinery company located in Migliarina di Carpi, Modena, Italy. It was founded in 1954 in Piacenza, Italy. ARBOS manufactures tractors, fertilizer equipment, seeding equipment and sprayers.

History 
ARBOS, a bicycle manufacturer, took its name from the acronym of two Piacenza businessmen Araldi and Boselli. In 1952 it was bought by Bubba S.A., a company that originated from SAFI in Piacenza, which in 1930 had taken over «Pietro Bubba & C.», the company that produced the Bubba agricultural tractors.

The Arbos-Bubba period 

In 1954 the company became Arbos-Bubba and launched a wheeled tractor with a 35 HP Perkins P4TA diesel engine, followed by a tracked version, with a choice of two engines, the next year: Perkins P4TA or the 32 HP Deutz F2L514. The tractors were not very successful: by the end of December 1955 it had sold only 33 wheeled versions and 9 tracked. In 1956 the brand dropped the Bubba name, and became simply Arbos. It produced the 100 C combine harvesters, wheeled and tracked, and the Allodola 650 with a diesel Fiat engine. These were followed by the 1000 Super and the 750 Super.

From the economic boom to the seventies 
In 1960 Arbos-Bubba became Arbos Spa.Arbos began producing combine harvesters in the new plant in San Lazzaro, close to Piacenza. Three years later they produced the new 1000 Major 87 HP, with the new olive green livery.

In 1964 Arbos Spa was taken over by the American company  White. The following year they released the flagship of European combine harvesters, the 1220. In a few years the range grew with new models: 1220, 780, Record and then 120 Pantera, 165 Tigre, 100 Lince and 125 Giaguaro. In 1971 they launched the Pantera 7 Colli, the first self-levelling combine harvester in the world, with levelling on 4 sides, longitudinal and transversal.

In 1972 Arbos Spa became a branch of White and the following year it launched the self-leveller 100 AL. On 20 November 1975 White Arbos Spa stopped trading and was wound up on the 31 December of that year.

The new Arbos 
In 1976 Arbos Spa was bought by the Magni brothers and renamed Nuova Arbos. The new company presented the self-levelling 565 AL and started producing two new self-levelling machines: the 565 A-4-L and the 705 A-4-L and two flat-land machines, 140 - 160.

In 1983 the Nuova Arbos changed hands once again, going back to its old name Arbos Spa, for the production of combine harvesters for wheat, rice and corn: 100 – 125 – 140 – 160 - 565 A4L – 705 A4L.

In 1985 Arbos SPA took over Italo Svizzera of ZolaPredosa (BO), to produce single row and double row beet harvesters. 
A year later it launched two new self-levelling combine harvesters, the 400 AL and the 200 AL. Subsequently, the company started focusing on updating the top of the range machines, by launching the 800 and 1000. The 600 was designed, but only one model was actually built.

In 1994, four years short of its centenary, Arbos folded definitively.

Rebirth 

In 2011 Lovol Heavy Industry ltd, Chinese manufacturer of tractors, agricultural machines and earth moving machinery, opened a research and development centre in Calderara di Reno (BO), to coordinate its activities in Europe. After taking over Arbos and Bubba, this new centre became the headquarters of a new holding, Lovol Arbos Group Spa, whose aim was to design three tractor platforms from 100 to 270 HP and recuperate the industrial know-how of Arbos combine harvesters.

In 2015, ARBOS Group launches a major acquisition plan designed to consolidate the foundations of a project that would shortly lead to the production of an integrated full-line solution within agricultural mechanization. The goal is to establish ARBOS as an international brand of reference for farmers around the world and for the entire agronomic cycle, by introducing products compatible with the latest cultivation, conservative farming and precision seeding techniques, moving from compact and highly specialized tractors to the creation of a full range for open field applications. For this reason, in 2015, two large companies join the ARBOS Group family. The first to be acquired in January is MaterMacc, a company from Pordenone specializing in the production of agricultural equipment, followed in December of the same year by Goldoni S.p.A., a historic company from the Emilia region producing tractors for orchards. These two companies serve to represent the strategic starting points for investment for the Group's industrial launch. In 2016, the Friulian company rolls out a new recruitment plan, as well as a number of major industrial renovations that result in the facility being extended by a further 55,000 m2. The plant at Migliarina di Carpi is also updated, with a focus on upgrading the assembly lines, renovating the offices and building a new center entirely devoted to Engineering, transferred from Calderara di Reno to the new headquarters in the Modena province.

Today 
During Agritechnica 2017, the Full Line of tractors and equipment in green livery is officially presented. The ARBOS brand is therefore ready to compete as a protagonist on the European market with a range of products that can support the entire agronomic cycle, from working the land to harvesting. 2018 is the year of the improvement of the range of high power tractors and the development of advanced equipment for precision seeding. In this sense, important news are awaited for EIMA 2018.

Models produced

Current range 
 C 5200 (prototype)
Open field tractors
 P5000 (100-130 HP)
 P6000 (140-200 HP | prototypes)
 P7000 (220-260 HP | prototypes)
Specialized tractors

 ARBOS 3000 (38 HP - 48 HP)
 ARBOS 4060F (49 HP)
 ARBOS 4080F (75 HP)
 ARBOS 4000Q (80 HP - 102 HP)
 ARBOS 4000AF(80 HP - 102 HP)- So economical that it produces fuel
 ARBOS 4000E (61 HP - 92 HP) - equal size weel

Implements

 MBS EVO - SPARAYER
 DIRECTA - DIRECT SEEDING
 MS 8230 - SEEDER
 MS 8130 - SEEDER
 MSD 2.0 COMBI - COMBINED SEEDER
 MMX - FERTILIZER
 MCA W - FERTILIZER
 ROCK 300 - SUBSOILER

External links

Note

See also 
 Bubba

Agricultural machinery manufacturers of Italy
Tractor manufacturers of Italy
Italian companies established in 1954
Manufacturing companies established in 1954